The Wheatley School is a public high school serving grades 8 through 12 located in Old Westbury, New York and part of the East Williston Union Free School District. The school district encompasses all of East Williston and parts of Mineola, Albertson, Old Westbury, and Roslyn Heights. 

As of the 2018-19 school year, the school had an enrollment of 711 students and 63.87 classroom teachers (on an FTE basis), for a student–teacher ratio of 11.13:1. There were 37 students (5.2% of enrollment) eligible for free lunch and 1 student (0.1% of students) eligible for reduced-cost lunch.

Alumni

Business
 Daniel Schwartz - CEO of Burger King
 Brett Katz - Investment Analyst at Orange Grove Bio

Academia 
 Steven Rubenstein - anthropologist
 Anita Silvers - philosopher, interested in medical ethics, bioethics, feminism, disability studies
 Dan Weiss - president of Haverford College

Culture, film, radio and television 
 Rick Berman - executive producer of several of the Star Trek television series
 Todd Glickman - radio meteorologist 
 Rick Hoffman - actor  
 Winnie Holzman - creator of My So Called Life, writer of thirtysomething and Wicked
 Katy Krassner - author and social media director for rock band Duran Duran; co-host of SiriusXM radio show WHOOOSH!. 
 Carol Leifer - Seinfeld writer, comedian  
 Dave Rothenberg - sports radio host, ESPN
 Steven Starr - filmmaker, media activist

Fashion 
 Carol Alt - model/actress/author

Journalism 
 Mitchell Stephens - journalist and professor of journalism and mass communications at New York University

Literature 
 Stephanie Klein - blogger and writer 
 Nicole Krauss - writer
 Todd Strasser - writer

Medicine
 Stefan P. Kruszewski - clinical and forensic psychiatrist, fraud investigator

Music
 Ned Lagin - musician

Public Policy, Law, and Government
 Arthur Engoron - Justice, New York State Supreme Court, New York County 
 Ian H. Solomon - Dean of Frank Batten School at the University of Virginia, former Executive Director of the World Bank.

Sports 
 Mike Masters - professional soccer player  
 Carlos Mendes - professional soccer player  
 Shep Messing - professional soccer player

See also

 East Williston Union Free School District

Notes

External links 
 
 50th anniversary version of the Wheatley Wildcat
 Long Island High School Soccer Information

Mineola, New York
Public high schools in New York (state)
Schools in Nassau County, New York
Public middle schools in New York (state)